This Gene Autry filmography lists the films and television episodes starring the American singing cowboy Gene Autry.

Overview
From 1934 to 1953, Autry appeared in 93 films. Discovered by film producer Nat Levine in 1934, Autry and his sidekick Smiley Burnette made their film debut for Mascot Pictures in In Old Santa Fe as part of a singing cowboy quartet. In 1935, Levine gave him the starring role in the 12-part serial The Phantom Empire. When Mascot was absorbed by the newly formed Republic Pictures, Autry went along to make 57 B Westerns in which he played under his own name, rode his own horse, Champion, had Burnette as his sidekick, and sang several songs in each film—including some that would become his most popular hits. In 1947, with his Republic contract fulfilled, Autry began producing his own films which were distributed by Columbia Pictures. For his Columbia films, Autry chose Sterling Holloway as his sidekick for five films, and then Pat Buttram for sixteen films. Burnette returned for the last six films released in 1953. From 1950 to 1955, Autry appeared in 91 episodes of The Gene Autry Show television series. Buttram played his sidekick in 83 of the 91 episodes.

While his films never achieved the critical recognition given to the films by John Ford, Henry Hathaway, and others, Autry was more popular than John Wayne for nearly a decade. He was voted the top Western movie star for six years in a row, and was named the fourth most popular of all box-office stars in America by film exhibitors in 1940. In the Motion Picture Herald Top Ten Money-Making Western Stars poll, Autry was listed every year from 1936 to 1942 and 1946 to 1954 (he served in the AAF 1943–45), holding first place from 1937 to 1942, and second place from 1947 to 1954. He appeared in the Box Office poll from 1936 to 1955, holding first place from 1936 to 1942, and second place from 1943 to 1952. His popularity with audiences was reflected in his box office drawing power, appeared in the Top Ten Money Makers Poll of all films from 1940 to 1942.

While Autry worked with many directors, screenwriters, and actresses throughout his career, some played especially important roles in the development of Autry's screen persona and style. Joe Kane directed 17 Autry films, Frank McDonald directed 9 films and 16 television episodes, George Sherman directed 5 films, William Morgan directed 7 films, John English directed 19 films and 2 television episodes, and George Archainbaud directed 12 films and 47 television episodes. Some writers were equally important in providing stories that Autry felt comfortable dramatizing. Oliver Drake wrote 7 screenplays, Dorrell and Stuart McGowen wrote 15, Betty Burbridge wrote 14, Gerald Geraghty wrote 19, Norman S. Hall wrote 10, and Olive Cooper wrote 6. Of the many leading ladies who played opposite Autry in his films and television series, a few stand out, including Ann Rutherford in 4 films, Carol Hughs in 3 films, June Storey in 10 films, Fay McKenzie in 5 films, ad Gail Davis in 14 films and 15 television episodes. One of the most important components of Autry's films was the comic relief provided by his sidekicks. Smiley Burnette co-starred in 60 Autry films, Sterling Holloway in 5 films, and Pat Buttramin in 16 films and 83 television episodes.

In his book Singing in the Saddle, author Douglas B. Green wrote that Autry had a profound impact on the western genre film, and that his early "pioneering films" heralded the musical western genre, which from that point on made up a high percentage of B-westerns. Other western stars began to make room in their films for musical numbers by popular western singing groups like the Sons of the Pioneers. Green continued:

As of 2014, a large number of these films and television episodes remain available via the Gene Autry Foundation on the Western Channel (a cable television station), the latter having collaborated with the Foundation to restore the Republic titles, which had been cut to a uniform 54 minutes for television release in the 1950s, to full length and to provide clean negative-based source prints for all the titles in the 1990s. Autry is the only person to have five stars on the Hollywood Walk of Fame, one in each of the five categories maintained by the Hollywood Chamber of Commerce—motion pictures, radio, recording, television, and live theater. His motion picture star is located at 6644 Hollywood Boulevard, and his television star is located at 6667 Hollywood Boulevard

Films

Television
The Gene Autry Show first aired on the CBS television network on Sunday July 23, 1950 and ran for five years for a total of 91 episodes, with the last show airing on December 17, 1955. All the shows were produced by Autry's Flying A Pictures production company and were 30 minutes in length. Fifteen episodes were filmed in color. The Gene Autry Show continued to be broadcast in syndication well into the 1970s.

References
Citations

Bibliography

External links
 Official Gene Autry website
 
 

Male actor filmographies
American filmographies
filmography